Cologne Body & Assembly is a Ford Motor Company automobile factory in the Nippes Merkenich district of Cologne, Germany, spanning .

The plant, which currently employs approx 4,097, has manufactured the 
Fiesta (1976–2025) and Ford's B-class MPV, the Fusion (2002-2012).

Produced vehicles

See also
List of Ford factories

References

Ford of Europe factories
Nippes, Cologne